The Aylmer Spitfires are a Canadian junior hockey team based in Aylmer, Ontario, Canada.  They play in the Provincial Junior Hockey League.

History
The franchise began in Tillsonburg as a Junior B team in 1974, first known as the Mavericks, then as the Titans from 1985 to 1991.  In 1991, the franchise was moved to Aylmer and was named the Aylmer Aces.  In 2003, the team dropped to Junior C as the Aylmer Spitfires.

In 2013, the Niagara & District Junior C Hockey League and the Southern Ontario Junior Hockey League realigned, sending the Spitfires into the SOJHL.

For the 2016/17 season the eight southern Ontario junior "C" hockey leagues combined to become the Provincial Junior Hockey League.  Each league rebranded and became a division in the new organization.  The SOJHL became the Yeck Division of the West Conference.

The playoffs for the 2019-20 season were cancelled due to the COVID-19 pandemic, leading to the team not being able to play a single game.

Season-by-season record
Note: GP = Games Played, W = Wins, L = Losses, T = Ties, OTL = Overtime Losses, GF = Goals for, GA = Goals against

References

External links
Spitfires Homepage

Niagara Junior C Hockey League teams
1974 establishments in Ontario
Ice hockey clubs established in 1974